Yuma is a home rule municipality that is the most populous municipality in Yuma County, Colorado, United States. The population was 3,524 at the 2010 census.

History
A post office called Yuma has been in operation since 1885.  The community was named after a Native American named Yuma who worked for the railroad, died and was buried near the town site.

Geography
Yuma is 27 miles from the nearest city, Wray.

Demographics

As of the census of 2000, there were 3,285 people, 1,275 households, and 847 families residing in the city. The racial makeup of the city was 91.39% White, 0.09% African American, 0.30% Native American, 0.03% Asian, 0.06% Pacific Islander, 7.06% from other races, and 1.07% from two or more races. Hispanic or Latino of any race were 23.47% of the population.

There were 1,275 households, out of which 32.9% had children under the age of 18 living with them, 52.8% were married couples living together, 9.1% had a female householder with no husband present, and 33.5% were non-families. 30.4% of all households were made up of individuals, and 14.6% had someone living alone who was 65 years of age or older.  The average household size was 2.53 and the average family size was 3.17.

In the city, the population was spread out, with 28.4% under the age of 18, 8.5% from 18 to 24, 26.4% from 25 to 44, 19.8% from 45 to 64, and 16.9% who were 65 years of age or older.  The median age was 36 years. For every 100 females, there were 93.7 males.  For every 100 females age 18 and over, there were 90.6 males.

The median income for a household in the city was $30,371, and the median income for a family was $36,657. Males had a median income of $25,962 versus $16,968 for females. The per capita income for the city was $14,424.  About 7.8% of families and 14.3% of the population were below the poverty line, including 18.3% of those under age 18 and 9.4% of those age 65 or over.

Yuma is the home of the Yuma Indians.  Teams consist of Football, Volleyball, Golf, Wrestling, Boys and Girls Cross Country, Boys and Girls Basketball, and Boys and Girls Track & Field.

Gallery

See also

Outline of Colorado
Index of Colorado-related articles
State of Colorado
Colorado cities and towns
Colorado municipalities
Colorado counties
Yuma County, Colorado

References

External links

CDOT map of the City of Yuma
GoYuma.com
The Yuma Pioneer

Cities in Yuma County, Colorado
Cities in Colorado